Japan: Earth's Enchanted Islands (also known as Wild Japan for international release) is a nature documentary series exploring the landscapes and wildlife of Japan. It was narrated by Michelle Dockery and was co-produced by the BBC Natural History Unit, NHK and National Geographic Channel. The series was broadcast in three parts in the United Kingdom, where it premiered in June 2015 on BBC Two and BBC Two HD.

Episodes

See also
 Wild China

References

External links
 
Wild Japan at BBC Earth
Wild Japan at BBC Earth Asia

BBC television documentaries
BBC high definition shows
Documentary films about nature
Nature educational television series
2015 British television series debuts
2015 British television series endings
Television shows set in Japan
National Geographic (American TV channel) original programming
Japan in non-Japanese culture